Tooting Junction railway station may refer to:
Tooting Junction railway station (1868-1894), the closed station
Tooting railway station, the current station but originally named Tooting Junction when it replaced the above